KNOX-TV, channel 10, was a VHF television station in Grand Forks, North Dakota that operated from December 11, 1955 to February 1964.

History
KNOX broadcast on channel 10 as an ABC affiliate. The station later signed on Winnipeg-targeted border blaster KCND-TV, which was a semi-satellite of KNOX, on November 7, 1960. While KNOX was a primary ABC affiliate, the station also carried programming from NBC.
 
In 1962, KNOX and KCND, along with KEND-TV (now KVLY-TV) in Fargo, North Dakota, were purchased for $675,200 by the Pembina Broadcasting Company, a group led by Ferris Traylor, the part-owner of an Indiana TV station. KNOX merged with KEND, and KNOX shut down in 1964 after KEND (known as KTHI-TV at this time) began transmitting from a tower in Blanchard, between Fargo and Grand Forks.  After KNOX-TV's shutdown, the Grand Forks area did not have a local television station until NBC affiliate WDAZ-TV signed on in 1967.

Channel 10 is now used by Fox affiliate (and KVRR satellite) KBRR serving Grand Forks, which signed on in 1985 licensed to Thief River Falls, Minnesota.

References

Television stations in North Dakota
Defunct television stations in the United States
Television channels and stations established in 1955
Television channels and stations disestablished in 1964
1955 establishments in North Dakota
1964 disestablishments in the United States
NOX